The following is a glossary of common English language terms used in the description of birds—warm-blooded vertebrates of the class Aves and the only living dinosaurs, characterized by , the ability to  in all but the approximately 60 extant species of flightless birds, toothless, the laying of hard-shelled eggs, a high metabolic rate, a four-chambered heart and a strong yet lightweight skeleton. 

Among other details such as size, proportions and shape, terms defining bird features developed and are used to describe features unique to the class—especially evolutionary adaptations that developed to aid flight. There are, for example, numerous terms describing the complex structural makeup of feathers (e.g.,  and ); types of feathers (e.g.,  and  feathers); and their growth and loss (e.g.,  and ).

There are thousands of terms that are unique to the study of birds. This glossary makes no attempt to cover them all, concentrating on terms that might be found across descriptions of multiple bird species by bird enthusiasts and ornithologists. As a rule, this glossary does not contain individual entries on any of the approximately 9,700 recognized living individual bird species of the world.

A

B

C

D

{| border="1"
|-
|carnivores (sometimes called faunivores): birds that predominantly forage for the meat of vertebrates—generally hunters as in certain birds of prey—including eagles, owls and shrikes, though piscivores, insectivores and crustacivores may be called specialized types of carnivores.
|-
|crustacivores: birds that forage for and eat crustaceans, such as crab-plovers and some rails.
|-
|detritivores: birds that forage for and eat decomposing material, such as vultures. It is usually used as a more general term than "saprovore" (defined below), which often connotes the eating of decaying flesh alone.
|-
|florivores: birds that forage for and eat plant material in general. Other terms for plant foraging specialization may apply to florivorous species, such as "frugivore" and "granivore".
|-
|folivores: birds that forage for and eat leaves, such as hoatzin and mousebirds.
|-
|frugivores: birds that forage for and eat fruit, such as turacos, tanagers and birds-of-paradise.
|-
|granivores: (sometimes called seed-eating): birds that forage for seeds and grains, such as geese, grouse and estrildid finches.
|-
|herbivore: birds that predominantly eat plant material, and mostly do not eat meat; especially of birds that are both granivorous and frugivorous or are grass eaters, such as whistling ducks, ostriches and mute swans.
|-
|insectivores: birds that forage for and eat insects and other arthropods, such as cuckoos, swallows, thrushes, drongos and woodpeckers.
|-
|nectarivores: birds that drink the nectar of flowers, such as hummingbirds, sunbirds and lorikeets.
|-
|omnivores (sometimes called general feeders): birds that forage for a variety of both plant and meat food sources, such as pheasants, tinamouses and quails. More birds fall under the omnivore classification than any other.
|-
|piscivores: birds that forage for and eat fish and other sea life, such as darters, loons, pelicans, penguins and storks.
|-
|sanguinivores: birds that forage for and drink blood, such as oxpeckers and sharp-beaked ground finches.
|-
|saprovores: birds that forage for and eat decaying flesh (carrion), such as vultures and crows. However, the term is also used at times synonymously with "detritivore" (defined above), for eaters of any dead matter.
|}

E

F

G

H

I

J

K

L

M

N

O

P

Q

R

S

T

U

V

W

Z

See also
 Glossary of dinosaur anatomy

Explanatory footnotes

Citations

Bibliography 
 
 
 
 
 
 
 
 

 
 
 
 
 
 
 
 
 
 
 
 
 
 
 
 
 
 

Birds

Bird
Wikipedia glossaries using description lists